Aaj Ke Sholey is a 1985 Indian Hindi feature film, directed by Rajendra Singh Babu and produced by R.S. Virk. The film stars Amrish Puri, Fighter Shetty, Sunder Krishna and Jayanti Manjula in major roles. The musical score of the film was done by Kamalkar and Satyam.

Cast 

 Amrish Puri
 Fighter Shetty
 Sundar Krishna
 Jayanti Manjula
 Dwarkesh
 Baby Rekha
 Baby Indira
 Dinesh Babu

References 

1980s Hindi-language films
1985 films
Films directed by Rajendra Singh Babu